Polaco is a Spanish derogatory term for a Catalan person. Its origins are not clear and all related theories are purely speculative, usually banking on the fact that the same word denotes a Pole. The name appears across all Spain, though in particular in Madrid and in the regions neighboring Catalonia. Rarely present in literary language, it forms part of the slang vocabulary; its best-known usage is during sport competitions. In Catalonia the term is accepted and at times used once its derogatory flavor is wiped out or reversed, such as when telling Catalans from other Spaniards. In Poland the term is generally unknown; when reported, its offensive connotation is marginalized or ignored, replaced with references to alleged Catalan sympathy towards Poland.

Antecedents

Historically the term "polacos" has been twice used in Spanish as an abuse or smear. In the late 18th century the name was applied to followers of one of two Madrid drama schools; in theatrical auditoria they used to trade insults with a competitive group, named "chorizos". The name allegedly stemmed from a cleric known as Padre Polaco, who used to lead his band. Both groupings were revived almost a century later with a popular zarzuela of Luis Mariano de Larra Chorizos y polacos (1876); the title immortalized both names, though there is no indication that they were used beyond the theatrical realm or had anything to do with Catalonia. Once more the term "polacos" emerged against an entirely different background in the mid-1850s; the name was applied to a faction of Partido Moderado. The grouping was led by Luis José Sartorius, a politician erroneously supposed to be of Polish origin. Because of the way the group operated, the terms "polacada", "polaquería" and "polaquísmo" soon started to stand for favoritism, cronyism and arbitrary personal decisions; the term "polaco" denoted a member of a clientelist political network. The name disappeared from public usage following Sartorius’ death, yet it enjoyed temporary revival in the 1880s and made it from the press to literature appearing in Miau, a novel of Benito Pérez Galdós (1888). The term "polacada" barely survived in Spanish until today, in dictionaries defined as "an act of favoritism"; when denoting a crony the word "polaco" disappeared entirely. One more episode of Poland-related naming practice occurred during the lifetime of the First Spanish Republic. Few liberal politicians dubbed Spain "Poland of the South"; the term was by no means derogatory and it was supposed to suggest that like Poland in the late 18th century, Spain faced a threat of a foreign reactionary intervention. The name was not anyhow related to Catalonia; adopted only among a small circle of liberal intellectuals it was used in the 1870s and did not make it as a commonly used reference.

Origins

Origins of the anti-Catalan usage of "polacos" are obscure. The theories striving to clarify the issue are abundant, yet they are all purely speculative and can hardly be verified. The most far-reaching hypothesis claims that supposed 17th-century merchant relations between Catalonia and Poland proved fertile soil for growth of ethnic stereotypes. Another theory points to the 18th-century theatrical debate, though it provides no clue as to the Catalan link. One more idea is about Polish soldiers fighting in Spain and by enemies confused with their Catalan allies; specifically some point to the War of Succession, some to the Peninsular War and some to the French intervention of 1823. There is a concept which reverts to Sartorius; his supposed Catalan cronies was allegedly the reason why the name was applied to the Catalans. Some authors dwell upon perceived parallelism between the Polish independence movement of the late 19th century and the emergent Catalan or Basque nationalisms. Divided between France and Spain, Catalonia – the theory goes – resembled Poland, the country divided between Germany, Austria and Russia; another version is that Catalan deputies to the Cortes were dubbed "Poles" because of their national exaltation. Few suggest that the derogatory term was exported to Spain by the Prussians. Others point to the Civil War period, when allegedly Nationalist soldiers on the Aragon front confused the Polish International Brigades volunteers with the Catalan Republican belligerents. One more group of students claim that the victorious Nationalists pledged to wipe out Catalonia from the maps just like the Germans did in case of Poland in 1939. A fairly popular thesis partially supported by evidence is that the insult emerged during Francoism as part of the barrack argot; the reference to Poland was casual and the term was to stigmatize Catalan recruits as "alien". There is a group of theories which do not refer to any point in time but bank on presumed similarities between the Catalans and the Poles, be it linguistic ("slurping" sound of the language), religious (black Madonnas of Częstochowa and Montserrat) or other (both nations are supposedly stingy).

Usage

There are a few slur references to the Catalans used in the present-day Spanish, like "catalufos", "catalinos", "catalardos" or their scatological variations. However, in terms of popularity none compares to "polacos", which is by some considered a "classic" form of anti-Catalan abuse. The term is clearly derogatory, though the intention might vary from slightly patronizing, ironic or minimizing to aggressively contemptuous. Its actual substance is blurred and illegible; the word is so much lexicalized that a possible reference to specific features or deficiencies – in case there was any – has long disappeared. While the insults of "catalufos" or "catalardos" are thrown usually against a political background and are applied to individuals supposed to nurture separatist Catalanist sentiments, the term "polacos" is more universal in usage. Geographically the abuse might be heard even in areas located far away from Catalonia, e.g. in Andalusia, though it remains particularly popular in Madrid. It is used also in regions neighboring Catalonia, be it the Balearic Islands, Valencia or Aragon; in case of the latter the term is often applied to inhabitants of the belt bordering Catalonia, named Franja. The name is used mostly in spoken Spanish, though sporadically it appears also in writing, mostly in social media; it is typical for colloquial language, yet at times it might surface in literary Spanish. The term is used in plural as "polacos" rather than in singular as "polaco". Generally it is intended to reach the Catalan audience directly or indirectly, e.g. during brawls. Currently the best known circumstances of usage are collective chants on sport venues, typically by fans supporting teams competing with FC Barcelona; it became sort of a ritual marking football or basketball games played at home by Real Madrid to cheer "es polaco el que no bote". Cases of public personalities using the term, e.g. those of a playwright Antonio Gala Velasco or a sport manager Ramón Mendoza Fontela, are usually acknowledged by the media.

Reception in Catalonia

Among the Catalans there is a general degree of awareness of the abusive role of the term "polacos" in Spanish. Their own response might fall into one of chiefly four categories. The one which because of its verbal and on the fly background is most difficult to document is indignation. Another – a fairly popular one – is about ignoring or eradicating the abusive intention; instead, the term is assigned a neutral, favorable or even proud flavor. A TV survey on the streets of Barcelona seems to demonstrate that the city dwellers are scarcely troubled by the word, and some of them speculate about Catalan and Polish comparisons related to such values as patriotism, national pride or solidarity. Some nationalist Catalan politicians, like Oriol Junqueras Vies, underline what they believe to be attractive features rendering the two nations alike.

One more type of response, made popular by TV, is turning the term into a paradigm of general political ridicule. This is how the term "polacos" is positioned by a satirical show Polònia, aired since 2006 by regional public Catalan channel TV3. Often banking on caricature Polish references, the broadcast provides a mocking commentary to ongoing political events in Spain and has proved to be a commercial success. In 2008 a sports-related and similarly formatted spin-off was launched, named Crackovia (a pun on Polish city Cracow and "crack", or sports ace).

The word "polacos" has also filtered into the Catalan language, though it lost its double designation; at times and when self-defining themselves against the background of Catalan-Spanish skirmishes the Catalans use the word "polacs", while another word "polonesos" stands for the Poles.

Reception among Poles

Abusive usage of the word "polacos" is not part of common knowledge in Poland, even though the phenomenon is reported in the media or elsewhere from time to time. A characteristic feature of these reports is downplaying, denying or ignoring the offensive intention; e.g. an official publication of the Warsaw Ministry of Foreign Affairs when dwelling upon the image of Poles in Spain notes merely that "in Catalonia the Poles are approached with particular sympathy, since inhabitants of the region are traditionally named polacos". News about "polacos" are often accompanied by speculations about Poland being reportedly a model for Catalonia, flagged by headlines like Catalans are proud to be Poles. Some authors present the abusive intention as a thing of the past related to Francoist origins of the nickname; they underline alleged Catalan warm feelings towards Poland, resulting from popularity of Polish cartoons for kids, esteem for Polish writers or admiration for the Polish history. The theme of Catalans fascinated with Polish patriotism, independence movement, fighting foreign oppression and contribution of Polish interbrigadistas to defense of Catalonia and the Republic during the civil war at times appears in the Polish cyberspace. Cases of "polacos" being reported clearly as "pejorative-ironic" and "fairly frequently used" abuse are rather uncommon; usually they occur when discussing the sporting rivalry between Real Madrid and FC Barcelona. As there are many Poles who have recently migrated to Spain, including Catalonia, some of them have noticed the particular usage of the word; like Polish media they play down its offensive tone and when referring to the phenomenon they set it as a somewhat amusing quid pro quo, e.g. introducing themselves as "Polacos de Polonia". A website operated by the Barcelona Poles refers to the term as "slightly pejorative", though also "colloquial" and "with a slight wink". However, there are also cases of the Poles reacting with fury and lambasting the term as insulting to the entire Polish nation.

See also
Polack
Polaca

Footnotes

Further reading

 Joan Avenallada, Viatge a l'origen dels insults, Badalona 2006, 
 Richard Fitzpatrick, El Clasico: Barcelona v. Real Madrid: Football's Greatest Rivalry, London 2012, 
 Ewa Wysocka, Barcelona, stolica Polski, Kraków 2016,

External links
 "if you don't jump you're a pole" during a football game
 "if you don't jump you're a pole" during a basketball game

Ethnic and religious slurs
Anti-Catalanism